Fritillaria viridea is a rare species of flowering plant in the lily family Liliaceae, known by the common name San Benito fritillary. It is endemic to the Central Coast Ranges of California, USA, where it belongs to the chaparral and serpentine soils flora.  There are confirmed records of this species from San Benito and Monterey Counties plus unconfirmed reports from Fresno and San Luis Obispo Counties.

Description
The smooth stem is topped with a raceme inflorescence of one or nodding bell-shaped flowers.

References

External links
 Hickman, J. C. 1993. The Jepson Manual: Higher Plants of California 1–1400. University of California Press, Berkeley.
 United States Department of Agriculture Plants Profile
 University of California @ Berkeley, Calphotos Photo gallery
 California Native Plant Database, Theodore Payne Foundation, Fritillaria viridea 

viridea
Endemic flora of California
Natural history of the California chaparral and woodlands
Natural history of the California Coast Ranges
Natural history of San Benito County, California
Plants described in 1863
Taxa named by Albert Kellogg